The 2001–02 WHL season was the 36th season for the Western Hockey League. Nineteen teams completed a 72-game season.  The Kootenay Ice won the President's Cup before going on to win the Memorial Cup.

League notes
The Vancouver Giants joined the WHL as its 19th franchise.
The Swift Current Broncos moved from the East division to the Central division.
The Kootenay Ice moved from the Central division to the B.C. division.
With the addition of the Giants, the WHL abandoned the three division format and moved to two conferences of two divisions each.  Ten teams in the East and nine in the West.  
The top four teams in each division qualified for the playoffs, though the 5th place team in the B.C. division could qualify in place of the 4th place team in the U.S. division if they had a better record.

Regular season

Final standings

Eastern Conference

Western Conference

Scoring leaders
Note: GP = Games played; G = Goals; A = Assists; Pts = Points; PIM = Penalties in minutes

Goaltending leaders
Note: GP = Games played; Min = Minutes played; W = Wins; L = Losses; T = Ties ; GA = Goals against; SO = Total shutouts; SV% = Save percentage; GAA = Goals against average

2002 WHL Playoffs

Conference quarterfinals

Eastern Conference

Western Conference

Conference semifinals

Conference finals

WHL Championship

All-Star game

On January 24, the WHL Eastern All-Stars were defeated by the OHL Western All-Stars 7–2 at Red Deer, Alberta with a crowd of 6,259.

On February 6, the WHL Western All-Stars defeated the QMJHL Dilio All-Stars 9–4 at Rimouski, Quebec with a crowd of 4,762.

WHL awards

All-Star Teams

source: Western Hockey League press release

See also
2002 Memorial Cup
2002 NHL Entry Draft
2001 in sports
2002 in sports

References
whl.ca
 2005–06 WHL Guide

Western Hockey League seasons
WHL
WHL